, is a fictional monster, or kaiju, in Toho Co., Ltd.'s Godzilla media franchise. The character first appeared in Godzilla (1998), released by TriStar Pictures. It was initially created as a reimagining of Godzilla but was later re-branded as a separate character. Patrick Tatopoulos designed it after iguanas with a slim theropod appearance rather than the thick, bipedal designs of Toho's Godzilla. TriStar's Godzilla, both the film and character, were negatively received by fans and critics. In 2004, it was featured in Toho's Godzilla: Final Wars as "Zilla". Afterwards, Toho trademarked new incarnations as Zilla, with only the iterations from the 1998 film and animated series retaining the Godzilla copyright and trademark.

Overview

Name

Initially, during production of Godzilla: Final Wars, director Ryuhei Kitamura asked producer Shōgo Tomiyama whether or not they were allowed to include TriStar's Godzilla in the film; whereupon Tomiyama checked Toho's contract with Sony and saw they were allowed to use it, Tomiyama stated: "Kitamura asked me if it was possible for us to use the American Godzilla in Final Wars, so I checked our contract with Sony Pictures and found out we could use it. Since this was the 50th anniversary film, I thought ‘Why not include the American Godzilla?'" This incarnation of TriStar's Godzilla was named "Zilla". This decision was made because they also felt that Emmerich's film had taken the "God" out of "Godzilla" by portraying the character as a mere animal. The name "Zilla" was chosen for the character by Tomiyama as a satirical take on counterfeit Godzilla products that use "Zilla" as a suffix.

Toho had filed the "Zilla" name on July 21, 2006, and it was registered on April 20, 2007. This name change has been reflected in subsequent official products featuring the character since 2004, though "Godzilla" continues to be used on products that predate the name change, such as home media re-releases of the 1998 film and Godzilla: The Series. Matt Frank (co-writer and illustrator of Godzilla: Rulers of Earth) further clarified the name change, stating, "Toho makes zero distinction between "Zilla" and "Godzilla 1998" with the exception of title alone. Ever since 2004, Toho's official stance has been that any future incarnations of the character be referred to hereafter as 'Zilla'." Keith Aiken (co-editor of SciFi Japan) also clarified that "Zilla is a variation of the 1998 Godzilla" but stressed that only the incarnations from the 1998 film and the animated series retain the Godzilla copyright and trademark. 

Toho had renewed the trademark on April 4, 2017 and is set to expire on April 20, 2027.

Development

During the production of the 1998 film, special effects artist Patrick Tatopoulos was contacted by director Roland Emmerich and asked to create a new design for the Godzilla character. According to Tatopoulos, the only specific instructions Emmerich gave him was that it should be able to run incredibly fast. Emmerich intended to depict the character as an animal rather than a monster. Godzilla was originally conceived by special effects director Eiji Tsubaraya, special effects designers Akira Wantanabe and Teizo Toshimitsu and producer Tomoyuki Tanaka as a robust, erect-standing, plantigrade reptilian sea monster, played by an actor in a rubber-latex full-body suit. Based on the instructions Emmerich gave him, Tatopoulos reimagined it as a lean, digitigrade bipedal iguana that stood with its back and tail parallel to the ground, rendered via computer animation. The monster's distinctive facial features include a prominent lantern jaw, inspired by the fictional tiger Shere Khan from Disney's animated adaptation of The Jungle Book.

TriStar's Godzilla color scheme was designed to reflect and blend in with the urban environment. At one point, it was planned to use motion capture to create the movements of the computer-generated monster, but it ended up looking too much like a man in a suit. The Baby Godzilla scenes utilized a combination of CGI and purpose built costumes donned by actors. Kurt Carley portrayed the suitmation sequences for the adult Godzilla in the 1998 film while Frank Welker provided the sound effects for both the adult Godzilla as well as the Baby Godzillas. Upon pending approval for the design, at the time, Shōgo Tomiyama commented on the new look, saying "It was so different we realized we couldn't make small adjustments. That left the major question of whether to approve it or not." Though TriStar's Godzilla was referred to by the film's characters as a "he", Patrick Tatopoulos stated on a DVD audio commentary that the effects crew sculpted female genitalia into the CG model of the creature.

Atypical of Toho's giant monster characters, TriStar's Godzilla is not immune to conventional weaponry, and instead relies on its cunning and athleticism to outflank its enemies. It can travel long distances over land and sea, burrow underground and reproduce via parthenogenesis, and is able to lay over 200 eggs, unlike its offspring in the animated series which was unable to reproduce. It possesses an ignitable radioactive breath weapon called "Power Breath", although its offspring could breathe a green atomic Power Breath in the animated series (where also the parent, resurrected as a cyborg called Cyber-Godzilla,  possessed a blue version), in which it was pitted against a rogues gallery of original monsters, after the producers were unable to secure the rights to adapt Toho's classic monsters. It was also featured in advertisements alongside the Taco Bell chihuahua.

TriStar's Godzilla was featured in the 2004 Toho film Godzilla: Final Wars as "Zilla"; this name would continue to be used and trademarked for later incarnations. A 3D scan of the Trendmasters "Ultimate Godzilla" toy was used as reference for Zilla. In the film, Zilla engages Toho's Godzilla in a battle intended "to show which Godzilla is stronger". Zilla would fight Godzilla again in a slightly longer battle, and even team up with Godzilla to fight other monsters, in the comic series by IDW Publishing titled Godzilla: Rulers of Earth running between 2013-2015.

Reception
The design and characterization of TriStar's Godzilla was negatively received. Film critic Richard Pusateri of G-Fan Magazine coined the acronym GINO ("Godzilla In Name Only") to distinguish it from Toho's Godzilla. while other publications referred to it as the "American Godzilla".

Tom Breihan from Deadspin stated that TriStar's Godzilla "wasn't motherfucking Godzilla at all," elaborating that the character was treated like a "tapped animal", lacked Godzilla's signature blue atomic breath, ran and hid, caused less damage, and that Emmerich and Devlin had "completely missed the entire point" of Godzilla.

These sentiments were echoed by veteran Godzilla suit actors Haruo Nakajima and Kenpachiro Satsuma, and by Shusuke Kaneko, director of the '90s Gamera films. Nakajima ridiculed the character design, stating: "Its face looks like an iguana and its body and limbs look like a frog". Satsuma walked out of the film, saying "it's not Godzilla, it doesn't have his spirit". Kaneko opined "[Americans] seem unable to accept a creature that cannot be put down by their arms", and later alluded to the character in his film Godzilla, Mothra and King Ghidorah: Giant Monsters All-Out Attack as a monster that Americans mistook for Godzilla. Thomas Tull (producer of Legendary's Godzilla series) criticized the design of TriStar's Godzilla, stating, "I’m always puzzled as a fan when you take things so far it’s unrecognizable." Toho publicist Yosuke Ogura later called TriStar's design a "disaster."

The animated version of the character was more positively received than its live-action predecessor, due to being closer in line with the spirit of Toho's Godzilla, possessing the ability to breathe atomic fire, battle monsters, and withstand attacks. However, the negative response to both Emmerich's Godzilla as well as the Disney remake of Mighty Joe Young released that same year, had caused giant monster movies to fall out of vogue for several years after, with films such as Peter Jackson's King Kong remake being postponed until 2005. Poor merchandise sales for the film led to a cancellation of a toy line based on Godzilla: The Series, and resulted in significant financial losses for toy manufacturer Trendmasters. Nicholas Raymond from Screen Rant described Toho's subsequent treatment of TriStar's Godzilla as "a clear sign that Toho doesn't regard the 1998 Godzilla as the King of the Monsters. It would appear that to them, he's just a giant lizard."

Appearances

TriStar's Godzilla has only made two film appearances in Godzilla and Godzilla: Final Wars and was vaguely referenced in Godzilla, Mothra and King Ghidorah: Giant Monsters All-Out Attack. TriStar originally planned to produce a trilogy, and Tab Murphy was commissioned by Emmerich and Devlin to write a story treatment for Godzilla 2. However, the sequels were cancelled due to the 1998 film's poor reception and TriStar let their remake/sequel rights expire on May 20, 2003.

An animated television series, Godzilla: The Series, was produced instead and served as a sequel to the 1998 film. It featured the surviving offspring from the 1998 film as the new Godzilla, as well as a reanimated cyborg version of its parent, named "Cyber-Godzilla". For the video games Godzilla: Save the Earth and Godzilla: Unleashed, developer Simon Strange decided not to include Zilla due to the character's unpopularity among fans. Strange received criticism from fans for not including Zilla in Godzilla: Unleashed.

Films
 Godzilla (1998)
 Godzilla: Final Wars (2004) – as Zilla

Television
 Godzilla: The Series (1998–2000)

Video games
 Godzilla Online (CD-ROM – 1998)
 Godzilla – The Aftermath (Online – 1998)
 G-Patrol VR Combat Simulator (Online – 1998)
 Godzilla (LCD – 1998)
 Godzilla: Virtual Shakin''' (LCD – 1998)
 Godzilla (Pinball – 1998)
 Godzilla Trading Battle (PlayStation – 1998)
 Godzilla Generations (Dreamcast – 1998) – as Godzilla-USA
 Godzilla: The Series (Game Boy Color – 1999)
 Godzilla: The Series – Monster Wars (Game Boy Color – 2000)
 Godzilla: Kaiju Collection (Android, iOS – 2015) – as Zilla

Literature
 Godzilla by Stephen Molstad (novel – 1998)
 Godzilla by H. B. Gilmour (novel – 1998)
 Godzilla: A Junior Novelization by H. B. Gilmour (novel – 1998)
 Godzilla by Kimberly Weinberger (book – 1998)
 Godzilla: Attack of the Baby Godzillas by Gina Shaw (book – 1998)
 Fox Kids Magazine – Godzilla: The Series (comic – 1998)
 Godzilla: Rulers of Earth (comic – 2013–2015) – as Zilla
 Godzilla: Oblivion (comic – 2016) – as Zilla
 Godzilla: Monster Apocalypse (novel – 2017) – as Zilla or French Godzilla

Music
 In the music video for "Heroes (David Bowie song)" performed by The Wallflowers, TriStar's Godzilla is featured.
 In the music video for "Come with Me (Puff Daddy song)" performed by Puff Daddy and Jimmy Page, TriStar's Godzilla is featured.
 In the music video for "Deeper Underground" performed by Jamiroquai, TriStar's Godzilla is featured.
 The song "No Shelter", by Rage Against the Machine, makes a reference to Godzilla. The song was also featured in the soundtrack for Godzilla (1998).
 The song "Brain Stew (The Godzilla Remix)", by Green Day, uses samples of TriStar's Godzilla roars.

Cultural references
 In 1998, TriStar's Godzilla made several commercials and advertisements for Taco Bell, crossing paths with the Taco Bell chihuahua.
 In 1998, TriStar's Godzilla featured in commercials and advertisements for Edy's and Dreyer's.
 In 1998, TriStar's Godzilla featured in commercials and advertisements for Sprint Corporation.
 In 1998, TriStar's Godzilla featured in commercials and advertisements for KFC.
 In 1998, the film Armageddon features a scene in New York where a little dog attacks Godzilla toys. This was a jab at Godzilla (1998) since Armageddon was in competition with the film at the time of both film's releases.
 In 1998, a parody of the cab chase sequence from the 1998 film was shown on MTV and featuring Samuel L. Jackson and Christopher Lloyd.
 In 1998, Discovery Zone featured an event called "Godzilla Laser Adventure" based upon Godzilla: The Series.
 In the 2005 Robot Chicken episode "That Hurts Me", TriStar's Godzilla was featured in the segment Godzilla Returns.
 In the 2005 Camp Lazlo episode "Snake Eyes", the TriStar Godzilla's roar is uttered by a snake at the beginning of the episode.
 In 2006, TriStar's Godzilla was featured in two Doritos commercials.
 In a 2007 trailer for Spider-Man 3, the TriStar Godzilla's roar is also audibly heard as Sandman dives down from the sand truck.
 In the 2008 Phineas & Ferb episode "It's About Time", a 30 foot tall T-Rex is shown using the TriStar Godzilla's trademark roar.
 In the 2009 Iron Man: Armored Adventures'' episode "Tales of Suspense: Part 2", Fin Fang Foom features the TriStar Godzilla's distinctive roar during the fight with Tony Stark and Gene Khan.

Notes

References

Citations

Bibliography
 
 
 
 
 
 
 

Film characters introduced in 1998
Fictional characters who can move at superhuman speeds
Fictional characters with superhuman strength
Fictional lizards
Fictional mutants
Godzilla characters
Kaiju
Toho monsters
Horror film villains
Science fiction film characters